İkinci Şordəhnə (also, Beylik-Shordekhne, Shordakhna Vtoroye, and Shordekhna Vtoroye) is a village in the Agdash Rayon of Azerbaijan.

References 

Populated places in Agdash District